Roy Adkins may refer to:

 Roy Adkins (American football) (1898–1975), American football player
 Roy Adkins (author) (born 1951), English writer and archaeologist
 Roy Francis Adkins (1947–1990), London gangland figure